Mike Snider (born May 5, 1961) is an American banjo player and humorist. He specialized in "old-time" mountain music which is a stylistic that can be traced back to the core beginnings of country music. He learned to play banjo at the age of 16. Although he is well known for comedic routine, he is a well respected banjo player. Much of his comedy is based on stories about his wife, Sabrina, referred to as Sweetie.

Musical career
In 1983 Snider won the National Banjo Championship, at the Walnut Valley Festival, Winfield, Kansas. He was asked to appear on the Grand Ole Opry as a guest artist in 1984. On June 2, 1990 he was inducted as a member of the Grand Ole Opry, by country comedian Minnie Pearl. He was a cast member on the variety show Hee Haw from 1990–1996. From 1991–1998 Snider performed at Opryland USA. Snider still performs regularly on the Grand Ole Opry.

Personal life
Snider lives in Gleason, Tennessee. He is married to Sabrina Snider. The couple has two children, Katie Lynn and Blake.

References

Living people
Grand Ole Opry members
1961 births
American banjoists
American humorists
People from Weakley County, Tennessee